Troy Sharmir Brewer (born January 29, 1989) is an American professional basketball player who last played for the Moncton Miracles of the National Basketball League of Canada. He played college basketball for the University of Georgia and American University.

High school and college career
As a senior at Montrose Christian School, Brewer earned first-team All-Gazette honors after averaging 14.7 points per game. In 2010–11, as a junior at American, Brewer averaged 11.5 points, 4.0 rebounds, and 1.3 assists per game. In 2011–12, as a senior, Brewer averaged 11.9 points, 3.4 rebounds, and 1.5 assists per game.

Professional career
On August 21, 2012, Brewer signed with Naturtex SZTE-Szedeák of Hungary for the 2012–13 season. However, he later parted ways with the team prior to the start of the regular season.

On May 14, 2013, Brewer signed with Værløse of Denmark for the 2013–14 season. In 19 games for Værløse, he averaged 16.6 points, 3.1 rebounds, 1.7 assists and 1.2 steals per game.

Brewer moved to Canada for the 2014–15 season, signing with the Moncton Miracles of the National Basketball League of Canada. In 30 games for Moncton, he averaged 11.0 points, 2.2 rebounds and 1.7 assists per game.

On November 2, 2015, Brewer was acquired by the Westchester Knicks after a successful tryout. However, he was waived by the Knicks five days later.

Personal life
The son of Sandra and Tony Brewer, who played basketball at Tennessee State. He has one sister, Tonia. Brewer majored in business administration.

References

External links 
 American University bio

1989 births
Living people
American Eagles men's basketball players
American expatriate basketball people in Canada
American expatriate basketball people in Denmark
Basketball players from Maryland
Georgia Bulldogs basketball players
Moncton Miracles players
People from Gaithersburg, Maryland
American men's basketball players
Guards (basketball)